Shahzada Mirza Muhammad Jahan Shah Bahadur (also known as Prince Mirza Jehan Shah) (1779–1846) was the son of Prince Mirza Akbar, who became the Emperor Akbar Shah II in 1806. He was a younger brother of Emperor Bahadur Shah II and former Crown Princes Mirza Jahangir and Mirza Salim. His mother Selaa'h un-nissa, was the third wife of the Emperor. He was the last Mughal ruler of Assam before Mughals left Assam. The Prince was under house arrest by British where he died at Assam at the age of 51.

Biography
His father ruled over a rapidly disintegrating empire between 1806 and 1837. It was during his time that the East India Company dispensed with the illusion of ruling in the name of the Mughal monarch and removed his name from the Persian texts that appeared on the coins struck by the company in the areas under their control.

His brother was not his father’s preferred choice as his successor. One of Akbar Shah's queens, Mumtaz Begum, had been pressuring him to declare her son, and Mirza Jahan Shah's half-brother Mirza Jahangir as his successor. The East India Company exiled Jahangir after he attacked their resident, Sir Archibald Seton, in the Red Fort.

Family
During his lifetime, he kept six wives, and had at least ten children. He died in 1846, years before the events of 1857 that ushered in the end of his dynasty and the rule of the Imperial family of India.

His grandson, Zahir Shah Mirza was the patriarch of the Singranatore family in the eastern provinces of the empire.

Sources

1795 births
1846 deaths
Mughal princes
People from Delhi
18th-century Indian royalty
19th-century Indian royalty
Indian people who died in prison custody
Prisoners who died in Indian detention